Edward Joseph Cronin (February 25, 1912 – November 24, 1958) was a Massachusetts lawyer and politician who served as Secretary of the Commonwealth from 1949 to 1958.

References

1912 births
1958 deaths
Northeastern University School of Law alumni
Politicians from Chelsea, Massachusetts
Secretaries of the Commonwealth of Massachusetts
Lawyers from Chelsea, Massachusetts
20th-century American politicians
20th-century American lawyers